East-West Group is a group of independent companies based internationally which operates a network of service companies focused on the Central Asian, Caucasus, Russian and Middle Eastern markets. The group offers a range of services such as business development, project management, IT and engineering services.

The group is represented in the United States, Belgium, United Kingdom, Central Asia, and the Middle East, and consists of several international subsidiaries.

External links
 East-West Group
 SCATRA Limited
 East-West Engineering

Holding companies of Luxembourg